Tackett Creek is a stream in the U.S. state of West Virginia.

Tackett Creek was named in the 18th century after Sam Tackett.

See also
List of rivers of West Virginia

References

Rivers of Kanawha County, West Virginia
Rivers of Putnam County, West Virginia
Rivers of West Virginia